The 2015–16 Niagara Purple Eagles women's basketball team represents Niagara University during the 2015–16 NCAA Division I women's basketball season. The Purple Eagles, led by first year head coach Jada Pierce, play their home games at the Gallagher Center and were members of the Metro Atlantic Athletic Conference. They finished the season 8–22, 5–15 in MAAC play to finish in a tie for ninth place. They advanced to the quarterfinals of the MAAC women's tournament where they lost to Quinnipiac.

Roster

Schedule

|-
!colspan=9 style="background:#4F2170; color:#FFFFFF;"| Regular season

|-
!colspan=9 style="background:#4F2170; color:#FFFFFF;"| MAAC Tournament

References

Niagara Purple Eagles women's basketball
Niagara